The Leica M-A (Typ 127) is a purely mechanical 35 mm rangefinder camera released by Leica Camera AG in 2014. The camera has no exposure meter, no electronic control, and no battery is required to operate it. The camera is Leica's first purely mechanical camera since the release of the Leica M4-P in 1981.

Design
The Leica M-A is very similar to the Leica M3, which was produced by Leica from 1954 to 1966. The Leica "red dot" has been deliberately omitted. Viewed from the side the M-A is also noticeably slimmer than its digital counterparts. The camera is enclosed in all-metal using chromed brass top & bottom covers. The camera comes in black or silver chrome finish.

Features
The stripped-down features of the M series cameras camera allows the photographer full manual control of all the settings without automation. The ISO dial at the back of the camera is purely decorative and serves only as a reminder. The camera is compatible with a wide range of M-mount Lenses from 16 to 135 mm. A lever allows the photographer to change the framing lines to suit three different pairs of lenses: 28/90 mm, 35/135 mm, and 50/75 mm.

References

External links
 Official website Leica-M-A Overview

Cameras introduced in 2014
M-A
Leica rangefinder cameras